The late Simon and Peggy Templer were a British couple who lived in Spain, where they dedicated their later lives to rescuing mistreated chimpanzees used by photographers on beach resorts. Spain had become a focus of the trade in chimpanzees for the tourist industry, and these apes would be severely abused. Simon and his wife Peggy took on the role of persuading the Spanish authorities (Guardia Civil) to confiscate the chimps and provide them a more safe environment.

Early years
Simon was born in England in 1913 and spent much of his childhood in Ceylon (Sri Lanka). His first names were actually Basil Henry Francis, but Peggy took to calling him Simon after the fictional character, and called him this until the end of his life. His family returned to the UK in 1924  when he was ten years old after his father had died. He was one of six children, two boys and four girls. His mother lived in Hammersmith, London, until she died. 

Peggy was born in 1920 in Liverpool. Her father was a Welsh school teacher. The family moved to Alexandria, Egypt where he taught for many years. When Peggy reached secondary age she was sent back to Wales to live with an Aunt. She got a place to study at Bangor University. By this time her parents were back in Wales and her father was a headmaster of a Prep School in Bangor. She had one younger sister.

The War
Simon and Peggy met during the Second World War. Peggy had started a degree in modern languages at Bangor University in Wales but decided to join the Women's Auxiliary Air Force with her close friend known as Bim. The two young women both became plotters, plotting aeroplane positions. Simon flew De Havilland Mosquito aerial photo-reconnaissance planes for the RAF. He had many narrow escapes, including a chase through the Brenner Pass in Austria/Italy. 

Simon and one of his fellow pilots met Peggy and Bim in a bar. After various exploits the two couples married and remained firm friends for years. Peggy and Simon had a home near RAF Benson. In 1942 Peggy gave birth to her first child. This was quickly followed by a second. 

In the latter part of the war Simon was moved to a training role (many of the early Mosquito pilots had been killed). He never talked of his time in the war and took many secrets to his grave. This may have been related to the Official Secrets Act.  It might also have been due to the fact that he was one of the lucky survivors. 

At the end of the war the family moved to Paris, where Simon joined the European partnership of Price Waterhouse, and was sent to open up an office in Barcelona, Spain.  These offices had been closed down during the Spanish Civil War.  He worked for them starting as a manager, and retired as a partner.

Move to Spain
Simon and Peggy moved to Barcelona, after a spell in Paris, a few years after the Second World War. They brought up their five children, Wendy, Michael, Dinah, Peter and Sally, in Barcelona. 

Simon was the founding Partner of Price Waterhouse in Spain. Peggy set up two English-language schools in Barcelona that are still going today, St Peter's School and St Paul's School. They were active members of the Barcelona Tennis Club. Peggy represented Spain at Wimbledon when the competition was still amateur. Whilst still in Barcelona they had a pet monkey called "Jimmy" who was well loved if naughty. Jimmy was the seed of many things. 

They lived in Barcelona until Simon retired and then built a new home in Breda (designed by Peggy), near Girona with lots of spare land. This was to prove useful! They spent their time rescuing dogs and other animals. Peggy was an accomplished artist and potter. She had her own kiln at the new home.

Rescuing chimpanzees
Simon and Peggy's mission to rescue chimps started in 1978. At around this time they became aware that baby chimps were being smuggled into Spain from Africa to be sold on the black market. These babies were then purchased by photographers who used them as props for the tourist industry on Spanish beaches. The apes would be physically and mentally abused - given drugs to keep them calm, beaten to remain sedate, given a poor diet, have their teeth knocked out to prevent them biting and would then be killed when they reached puberty once they became uncontrollable. 

The Templers worked extremely hard to end this trade and the mistreatment of chimpanzees by recruiting assistance from the Spanish Authorities, the Guardia Civil Council. They asked the Guardia to confiscate the beach chimps. In the meantime Simon and Peggy built a half-way house at their home in Breda near Girona in which to house them. The Templers battled to save every single beach chimp and give them a home. The number of chimpanzees quickly grew to around 40.

After relentless work they achieved their aim but were faced with a dilemma.  Their small half-way house could not accommodate all the chimpanzees, and therefore a more ambitious solution was needed.

Monkey World

In 1986, a man called Jim Cronin approached the Templers and discussed how he could possibly help. Cronin had an ambition to build a rescue centre for primates and their ideas matched. Simon and Peggy needed to find much bigger accommodation for their beloved chimps and Jim promised to build a sanctuary in Dorset, England to re-home the chimpanzees. By 1987, Jim Cronin set up Monkey World and was able re-home the Templers' chimpanzees and given them all a permanent, safe home at Monkey World. All the chimpanzees at Monkey World that were rescued from Spanish beach photographers were saved by the Templers in the mid 1980s.

MONA Chimpanzee Sanctuary

The MONA Chimpanzee Sanctuary was founded by the veterinarian, Olga Feliu, who was often called upon by Simon and Peggy Templer. The centre was set up to provide a sanctuary for abused beach chimpanzees used by photographers on beach resorts. MONA has provided a home to confiscated apes, as well as providing a home to a few Barbary macaques which are at the centre today.

Death
Peggy Templer died at home (Breda, near Girona) of cancer in 1991 after a few years of illness. Simon Templer died in March 1997 while on holiday visiting his son, Peter, in Nairobi, Kenya.

They left five children, 14 grandchildren, and 23 great-grandchildren.

References

Templer
Templer